Carmen Luz Parot Alonso (born 1967) is a Chilean journalist and documentary filmmaker.

Biography
Parot graduated as a journalist from the Pontifical Catholic University of Chile and studied photography with Héctor Ríos. She began her career working in various media, such as the newspaper  and the television channels  and Canal 13. On the Rock & Pop channel, she was editor of the program . She also worked with the musical group Inti-Illimani, making reports and music videos.

The idea to create her first documentary, Víctor Jara: El derecho de vivir en paz, arose while doing a journalistic investigation on the Chilean singer tortured and murdered during the military dictatorship. In the film the director used as much archival material – interviews and concerts of Jara –  as later interviews with the singer's relatives and friends. Later she premiered the documentary Estadio Nacional, that shows how the eponymous stadium was used as a detention center during the military dictatorship.

On the occasion of the reform of the Copyright law of Chile, the director criticized some of its provisions, especially those that affected the work of documentarists. According to Parot, the exception for using works protected by copyright for informational purposes allowed the media to use parts of her documentaries without financial compensation, despite the fact that the media themselves charge for the incorporation of their materials into her films.

In 2015 the documentary television series Chile en llamas premiered on Chilevisión.

Filmography
 1999 – Víctor Jara: El derecho de vivir en paz
 2003 – Estadio Nacional

References

External links
 

1967 births
Chilean documentary film directors
Chilean journalists
Chilean women journalists
Place of birth missing (living people)
Pontifical Catholic University of Chile alumni
Chilean women film directors
Living people
Women documentary filmmakers